Shutter is a 2012 Indian Malayalam thriller film written and directed by theater actor and playwright Joy Mathew in his directorial debut. The film set and filmed in  Kozhikode, stars Lal, Sreenivasan, Vinay Forrt, Sajitha Madathil and Riya Saira. Renganaath Ravee does the sound design, Hari Nair cranks the camera. The film notably features a poem by Pablo Neruda, set to music and sung by Shahabaz Aman. Biby Sam and Jacob Panikker composed the background score for the film.

Claimed to be a part of the new-wave in Malayalam cinema, the film is a satire about Indian laborers in the Gulf and is set within two days and a night in the city of Kozhikode. The film portrays unexpected incidents happening in two days and a night in the city of Kozhikode. The story centers around the mess created by three men — a Gulf Malayali, a film director and an auto driver — after they meet a strange woman in bizarre circumstance. The film is a moral suspense thriller and according to the director it is "poetical violence on celluloid".

The film had its Indian premiere at the 17th International Film Festival of Kerala and international premiere at the 9th Dubai International Film Festival. It won the Silver Crow Pheasant Award for Best Feature Film (Audience Prize) at the 17th International Film Festival of Kerala.

The film was a critical and commercial success, which led to its remakes Shutter (2014) in Marathi and Oru Naal Iravil (2015) in Tamil. It was also remade in Tulu in 2016 as Shutterdulai. Prakash Raj remade the movie into Kannada-Telugu bilingual called  Idolle Ramayana in Kannada and Mana Oori Ramayanam in Telugu. It was also remade in Punjabi in 2016 as Lock.

This is the only movie to have a version in all five South Indian languages. With six remakes, it is one of the most remade movies in India.

Plot
Rasheed is an NRI working in the Gulf. He comes to his hometown Kozhikode on a vacation for his daughter's engagement. Rasheed has invested in a commercial property next to his house which he has let out to store owners, except for one room. During his holiday, he meets his friends here and they bond every night over a few peg of drinks. During one of these days, Rasheed's friend Nanmarayil Suran, an autorickshaw driver, locks him with a prostitute in a garage from the outside to let the two have some fun. He fails to turn up as promised and the two end up spending two nights and one day together in the garage. The rest of the narrative revolves around the embarrassing plight of these two and the lives of Suran, Thankam and Manoharan.

Cast
 Lal as Rasheed
 Sreenivasan as Director Manoharan
 Vinay Forrt as Nanmayil Suran
 Sajitha Madathil as Thankam, the prostitute
 Riya Saira as Nyla, Rasheed's daughter
 Nisha Joseph as Rasheed's wife
 Augustine as Prabhu
 Prem Kumar as S.I. Subhashchandran
 Vijayan Karanthoor
 Appunni Sasi

Production
The film marks the directorial debut of Joy Mathew, who is a well known face in the Malayalam drama industry and shot to fame in films by portraying the central character in John Abraham's classic film Amma Ariyan. Noted theatre actor Sajtha Madathil plays the female lead in the film while Apoorvaragam fame Vinay Forrt plays the role of an autorickshaw driver. The film includes about sixty experienced theatre actors from Kerala and Gulf countries. Academy Award-winning sound designer Resul Pookutty was initially approached for the film's sound recording. When he opted out, another noted sound designer Renganaath Ravee was chosen. The sound mixing was done by M. R. Rajakrishnan.  National award-winning cinematographer Hari Nair wields camera for the film. A longtime friend of Joy Mathew, Nair is making his comeback to Malayalam cinema after quite a long gap with this film.

The film was completely shot from Kozhikode and was completed by July 2012.

Soundtrack

The soundtrack to the film features three songs. The first is a translation of Veinte poemas de amor by Pablo Neruda, written, set to music and sung by Shahabaz Aman. A teenage school student from Kozhikkode, Zubin Imtiaz, was approached to provide a bilingual song, "Kyun". Along with Jacob Panikker, he penned the Hindi lyrics while Joy Mathew provided the Malayalam verse. Zubin and Biby Sam composed the music for the song. The third song which is briefly heard sung by Joy Mathew in a cameo appearance in the film, is played during the ending credits. The lyricist of this old folk song is not known.

Release and reception

Film festival screening
The film had its Indian premiere on 9 December 2012 at the 17th International Film Festival of Kerala where it was screened in the International Competition Section. The film's international premiere was at the 9th Dubai International Film Festival where it was screened on 10 December at the Cross Section of Indian Films section. The film had won the Silver Crow Pheasant award for the best movie in the Audience Choice section.

Theatrical release
The film had its theatrical release on 22 February 2013.
Gold Coin Motion Pictures, owned by ace film director, Ranjith Balakrishnan, and Seven Arts pictures has taken the distribution rights.

Critical response
Veeyen of Nowrunning.com stated that "Joy Mathew's directorial debut reinstates your faith in fine cinema, and has already made it to my list of the most gratifying films of the year." He also added  that "Shutter is a keenly observed drama on human predicament that appears delectably funny at times and palpably poignant at others."

Paresh Palicha of Rediff.com says "Shutter which has already won  critical acclaim deserves to be successful at the box office too."

Rating the film 3 stars out of 5, Dalton L of Deccan Chronicle says "Joy Mathew’s drama, through an act of trust, forces open the shutters of the conservative eyes of a moralist with double standards, humbles him, and sets him free from the shackles of his sinful thoughts."

The Times of India called Lal's performance "stunning" and said that "Vinay pulls off a performance that overshadows Lal, Sajitha and Sreenivasan." The Hindu said the film "celebrates the sights and smells of Kozhikode" and while "the twist comes a bit too delayed", the film "fully taps the curiosity factor, making the audience feel for each well-shaped character".

film fare awards,

 International Film Festival of Kerala (2012): Silver Crow Pheasant Award (Rajata Chakoram) for Best Feature Film (Audience Prize)

Remakes
Shutter has been remade in 
several languages and is set to be remade in Hindi.

References

External links
 

2012 films
2010s Malayalam-language films
2012 thriller films
Films set in Kerala
Films scored by Shahabaz Aman
Malayalam films remade in other languages
Indian thriller films
Films shot in Kozhikode
2012 directorial debut films